Orange RDC (formerly Congo Chine Télécoms or CCT) is a telecommunications company operating in the Democratic Republic of the Congo. The company was originally a joint venture of Chinese company ZTE, who owned 51%, and the Congolese state, who owned 49%. The company's mobile network began operating in 2001. Its head offices are located in Kinshasa. Orange RDC has about 100 employees. In October 2011 France Télécom (now Orange S.A.) acquired 100% of the company and was renamed Orange RDC on 5 December 2012.

Operations
Orange RDC offers telephony, mobile phone and internet service.

As of December 2012, Orange RDC has 1.8 million mobile customers.

Localization
Orange RDC markets a set of localized menus ("Kit A12+") in Lingala, Tshiluba, French, Kongo, and Swahili.

References

External links
 

Telecommunications companies of the Democratic Republic of the Congo
Companies based in Kinshasa
Orange S.A.